Joseph O'Neill was an Irish Fianna Fáil politician who briefly served as a member of the 14th Seanad. He was nominated by the Taoiseach Charles Haughey, on 16 July 1981, to fill a vacancy caused by the election of Mary Harney to Dáil Éireann at the 1981 general election. He did not contest the 1981 Seanad election.

References

Year of birth missing
Year of death missing
Fianna Fáil senators
Members of the 14th Seanad
Nominated members of Seanad Éireann